Giuseppe De Nigris (1832 – 1903) was an Italian painter, who depicted genre, Neo-Pompeian, and still-life subjects.

Biography
He was born in Foggia. In 1848, he left, along with Vincenzo Dattoli, to study in Rome. He was arrested for suspected seditious activity. Repatriated, he moved to Naples, where he had studied at the Academy of Fine Arts of Naples under Giuseppe Mancinelli. He was able to return to Rome in 1859, when Domenico Morelli gave him a letter to allow him to work in the studio of Achille Vertunni. A year later he returned to Naples, which was in patriotic ferment.

Among his works exhibited in Naples were Canzone d' amore,  L'ultima Messa, Le cieche operaie, and Vino e donna. In 1887 at Venice, he displayed Il primo ritratto. He painted two still-life arrangements on a bright background presently in England. He was influenced in his still life work by Gioacchino Toma.

In Neapolitan exhibitions, he displayed Christ in the Garden (1855) and Ossian e Malvina (1859). After the 1860s, his subject matter included patriotic and genre themes, in addition to neopompeian subjects. Among the works were Il Campanello della Parrochia; La mano del ladro; Garibaldi dicente: che tristo destino degli uomini lo scannarsi fra loro (1862, Naples); La processione di penitenza nelle catacombe di Napoli (1880); Piccoli gladiatori pompeiani (1870, Parma); Last day of Pompei (1873, Vienna); Ultima messa (1878, Paris); Manichino (1892, Florence); and Lo studio del frenologo Gall (1894, Rome). He was highly prolific in exhibitions, participating in many foreign exhibits including London (1888) and Melbourne (1880).

He completed a four patriotic canvases: Garibaldi dicente, Le impressioni di un quadro, Garibaldi a Caprera, I morti di Mentana, and Les merveilles du Chassepot.

De Nigris died in Naples in 1903.

References

19th-century Italian painters
Italian male painters
20th-century Italian painters
20th-century Italian male artists
1832 births
1903 deaths
Italian still life painters
Italian genre painters
19th-century Italian male artists